Iresh Saxena (born 14 March 1984) is a Bengal cricketer who made his debut against Madhya Pradesh at Gwalior, 10–13 November 2008. He was signed on Indian Premier League for Kolkata Knight Riders.

External links

1984 births
Living people
Indian cricketers
Kolkata Knight Riders cricketers
Bengal cricketers
India Blue cricketers
East Zone cricketers